Cavaly Association Sportive (commonly referred to as Cavaly AS or simply Cavaly) is a professional football club based in Léogâne, Haiti, that currently plays in the Ligue Haïtienne.

Honours
Ligue Haïtienne  1: 2007 F
CFU Club Championship 1: 2021

International competitions
CONCACAF Champions League : 1 appearance
2022 - Qualified vs New England Revolution. Withdrew February 15, 2022

CFU Club Championship: 2 appearances
2009 – Second Round – lost against  W Connection – 3–1, 0–1; 4–1 on aggregate
2021 - Final - vs  Inter Moengotapoe W 3-0

Current squad

References

 
Football clubs in Haiti
Léogâne
1975 establishments in Haiti
Association football clubs established in 1975